The Social Buccaneer may refer to:
 The Social Buccaneer (1916 film)
 The Social Buccaneer (1923 film)